Xcept One is the second album by composer Michael Hoenig, released in 1987 through Capitol Records.

Track listing

Personnel 
Musicians
Harold Budd – Synclavier
Brad Ellis – keyboards, Synclavier, mixing
Michael Hoenig – Synclavier, synthesizers, production, mixing
Ralph Humphrey – electronic drum
Production and additional personnel
Roy Kohara – art direction
Anne Miller – painting
Michael Rockwell – engineering, mixing, programming
Howard Rosenberg – photography
Wally Traugott – mastering
Roland Young – design, art direction

References

External links 
 

1987 albums
Capitol Records albums
Michael Hoenig albums